The Algiers Derby is the name given to matches between MC Alger and USM Alger, both football clubs from Algiers, Algeria. It is the oldest club football derby in Algeria, with the first match being contested in 1940. MC Alger play at the Stade 5 Juillet 1962 and USM Alger at Stade Omar Hammadi. The two clubs have met in every domestic competition, including those held before independence.

History

Early years
The Algiers Derby between USM Alger and MC Alger is the biggest derby in Algeria. The first meeting between the two teams in 1940 ended in victory for MC Alger. In the Final of the 1962–63 Algerian Championnat National, USMA won 3-0 against MC Alger, becoming the first champion following the independence of Algeria.

In 1971, MC Alger secured the Cup Final with a 2-0 win over USMA, and went on to repeat the same feat two years later in a 4-2 victory after extra time. In 1982, USM Alger dispatched MC Alger in the quarterfinals on the way to winning their first Cup Final. 

In 1977 a sports reform was carried out as intended by the Ministry of Youth and Sports, in order to give the elite clubs a good financial base allowing them to structure themselves professionally (in ASP Which means Association Sportive de Performances). The aim was therefore that they should have full management autonomy with the creation of their own training center. MC Alger sponsored by the national hydrocarbon company Sonatrach which induces the change of its name which becomes Mouloudia Pétroliers d'Alger (MPA). as for USM Alger sponsors the club and change the name to Union sportive kahraba d'Alger (USK Alger), meaning electricity who had inherited the Société nationale de l'électricité et du gaz company (Sonelgaz).

Apart from that victory, USM Alger struggled during the 1980's and early 90's, playing only five seasons in the top flight, thus limiting the number of meaningful derbies.

Promoted of USM Alger and the derby return again
In 1995, the USM Alger returned to the top flight for the first time in five seasons, only to return again derby between the two teams first meeting after the return was a Stade Omar Hammadi throwing stopped because of the violence to be again behind closed doors and the same pitch and it was the last time playing teams at this stadium derby presence The public and in the same season the USMA won the league title after thirty-three years for first title.

in the 1998–99 Algerian Cup Semi-finals there was a great controversy over the way the game was played, where it was supposed to play from two games, but the Ministry of Youth and Sports decided to play the two games in Stade du 5 Juillet, Saïd Allik President of USMA, refused this insisting that each team plays in his stadium and Stade du 5 Juillet, he was the official stadium of MC Alger, after which the Minister of Youth and Sports Mohamed Aziz Derouaz rejected this request and insisted that he play on Stade du 5 Juillet for security reasons. On the day of the match, USM Alger went to Omar Hamadi Stadium and MC Alger and the referees to Stade du 5 Juillet. Minister of the Interior and Local Authorities at that time Abdelmalek Sellal called Allik to find a solution to this problem, His response was that there were two solutions the first is that each team plays in its stadium Or hold one game in a neutral stadium, and Allik proposes Stade du 19 Mai 1956 in Annaba, but because of the black decade and since both of them are from the capital, it was decided to hold it in Stade du 5 Juillet.

In 2004 Stade 5 Juillet 1962 in a Ramadan evening in a meeting months is the presence of more than 100,000 spectators, it won the USMA lead to 1-2 and scored the winning goal player Hocine Achiou a goal from a heel like « Madjer », in the return leg MCA won by the score 1-2 goals scored Noureddine Daham, the first win in six years Then the two teams met in the final of the cup twice in 2006 and 2007 a row ended with the victory of MCA and simplifies the control of the MCA in the cup in the fourth final between the two teams, In the 2005-2006 season, he met with the two teams in the league in the first leg at Stade 5 Juillet 1962 MC Alger take the lead, by centre-back Ismaël Bouzid in 18 minutes, where he remained advanced the lead, and after that the supporters of USMA looked to leave and celebrate the supporters of MCA winning Nigerian striker Michael Eneramo arises in the final seconds to restore order. Moulay Haddou recovers a touchdown Boudiaf and on a long center will find Eneramo, strangely alone who, with a stitched head, releases his own and will make cry for goalkeeper Merouane Abdouni who certainly did not accept to cash a goal of the kind against his former team in one of the most exciting matches between the two clubs.

Second professional era (since 2010)
It was decided by the Ligue de Football Professionnel and the Algerian Football Federation to professionalize the Algerian football championship, starting from the 2010–11 season Thus all the Algerian football clubs which until then enjoyed the status of semi-professional club, will acquire the professional appointment this season. the president of the Algerian Football Federation, Mohamed Raouraoua, has been speaking since his inauguration as the federation's president in Professionalism, USM Alger become the first professional club in Algeria businessman Ali Haddad became the majority share owner after investing 700 million Algeria dinars to buy an 83% ownership in the club. On October 27, 2010, Haddad replaced Saïd Allik as president of the club. Allik had been the club's president for the past 18 years. As for MC Alger a protocol of agreement was signed between Sonatrach and SSPA MCA to purchase 100 percent of the capital of the sports company with shares of MC Alger, The President and General Manager of the Petroleum Company as well as the Executive Financial Director of the company Omar Beja, attended on the Mouloudia side, Chairman of the Board of Directors Abdelkader Bouhraoua who signed the protocol. Regarding the debts recorded in the proceeds, the shareholders of the sports institution with shares pledged to MCA to give up their shares in favor of Sonatrach at the nominal value of the latter.

In the 2013 Algerian Cup Final for the fifth time in history. USM Alger defeated of them with a goal scored by Mokhtar Benmoussa. USMA won its eighth title. Also this was the first time that Al Ittihad won against Mouloudia in the final after four defeats before. After the end of the match and while heading to get the medals, MC Alger refused to go up in protest against the performance of referee Djamel Haimoudi, and then has to punish the club president Omar Gharib lifelong player Faouzi Chaouchi and Réda Babouche two years and coach Djamel Menad one year. In 2014, the two teams met in the final of the Super Cup, for the first time, and the game ended with MC Alger victory by a goal scored Sid Ahmed Aouedj. Moreover, a scandal then mars this competition. Algerian international assistant referee, Amine Bitam, together with the game officer, told the local press that a senior Algerian official ordered for MCA players to deliberately injure their opponents during the match. A worthwhile goal for USM Alger was denied under the pretext of offside. The case is currently in court.
the two clubs met again for the Super cup in first of November 2016, the game was played at the Mustapha Tchaker Stadium and USMA were crowned winners after the game ended with 2 goals scored Farouk Chafaï and Mohamed Rabie Meftah by a penalty.

On June 2, 2019, it is official, the Haddad family is selling its 92% shareholding in SSPA USMA. It was the club's communication officer, Amine Tirmane, who announced it on the Echourouk TV. the reasons that made them make this decision is the imprisonment of club owner Ali Haddad and also freeze all financial accounts of the club. After it was expected that the USM Alger general assembly of shareholders will be on March 12, 2020, it was submitted to March 2, especially after the imprisonment of the former club president, Rabouh Haddad. The meeting witnessed the attendance of ETRHB Haddad representative and the absence of the amateur club president Saïd Allik, and after two and a half hours, it was announced that Groupe SERPORT had bought the shares of ETRHB Haddad which amounted to 94.34%. On August 8, 2021 the President of the Republic Abdelmadjid Tebboune has announced that the management of the new stadium of Douera will be for MC Alger. As he recalled the founding of the Club on August 7, 1921 by the late Abderrahmane Aouf, and returned to the team's obstacle course and its stoppage before and during the Algerian war. The rate of progress of the stadium's work has reached around 55%, according to the 2020 activity report presented last February by the Ministry of Youth and Sports. For several years, several Algerian clubs including USM Alger, CR Belouizdad and MC Alger have been asking that one of the two new football stadiums under construction in Baraki and Douera be awarded to them.

Supporters

Ouled EL Bahdja

Is the best encourage football clubs in Algeria Group was founded in the nineties and the only one in that period, which was recorded with a sporty character songs, as they always give great pictures in the stands on the way the fans of Milan because of the similarity of the colors red and black made the group Ouled EL Bahdja make a big gap in all stadiums inside and outside the home have made many tifo in the Ligue Professionnelle 1 or in continental competitions as for Music of Ouled EL Bahdja Every masses in Algeria frequency with the change of name of the club only because of her fame that went beyond the border in Tunisia and Morocco. On December 14, 2022, Ouled EL Bahdja announced that it had stopped its activity after 15 years. Its members said that after deep thinking that lasted for several months in the interest of the club, they are withdrawing, and secondly, they are no longer able to serve USM Alger as they did before, and also the problems and harassment that befell them, and even from them. He was dragged to the courts, and the statement was concluded with the slogan, USMA will remain, EL Bahdja will remain, and history will remain.

Verde Leone

Among the club's supporters groups, the Ultras Verde Leone (UVL07), a group of young supporters created on October 10, 2007 and dissolved in 2018. This group made its first appearance during an Algerian league match on October 21, 2007 against JS Kabylie, It is the first group of Ultras in Algeria. The other groups are the ultras the twelfth player (UTTP), the ultras green corsairs (UGC), vert et rouge (GVR) which retired in 2019 as well as the ultras amore e mentalità (UAM) and the ultras Squalo verde (USV) who joined the ultra movement in 2019.

Derby accident 2013
On 21 September 2013 Died, two supporters of USM Alger attended the events of the match against MC Alger, after the collapse of part of the "Stade 5 Juillet 1962", The incident and the death of supporters Azeeb Sufyan and Saif al-Din Darhoum, and injuring several hundred others in Algiers spoiled the joy of winning the Darby supporters of the USM Alger, The drama occurred ten minutes after the end of the match. Part of the 13th of the Stade 5 Juillet 1962 collapsed. After this incident there was a plan to destroy the whole stadium, but they retreated and decided to remove only the upper terraces and renovate them completely, the local authorities decided to close the stadium, where an investigation was opened into the incident he was also sacked director of the compound Youcef Kara after that, the funeral was attended by officials of the USM Alger led by Rabouh Haddad, who conveyed condolences to the family of the deceased and their condolences.

All-time head-to-head results

All-Time Top Scorers

All-Time Top appearances
Bold Still playing competitive football in Algeria
Statistics correct as of game on 20 December 2022

Consecutive goalscoring

Honours
MC Alger won their first honour in 1948 with victory in the départementale Cup and USM Alger in 1963 with the national championship title. There have been once occasions where MC Alger and USM Alger, finished champions and runners-up in the Ligue 1, the 1962–63 seasons.

League matches 
The matches listed below are only Algerian Ligue Professionnelle 1 matches, club name in bold indicates win. The score is given at full-time and half-time (in brackets), and in the goals columns, the goalscorer and time when goal was scored is noted.

Algerian Cup results

League Cup results

Super Cup results

Red cards
Including all the Ligue 1, Algerian Cup and Super Cup games since 1962–63.

Shared player history

Players who have played for both clubs

  Nassim Bouchema (MC Alger 2007–11, USM Alger 2011–16)
  Brahim Boudebouda (MC Alger 2008–11 & 2016–18, USM Alger 2011–16)
  Ismaël Bouzid (MC Alger 2005–06, USM Alger 2012–13)
  Omar Betrouni (MC Alger 1967–80, USM Alger 1980–83)
  Noureddine Daham (MC Alger 2003–06, USM Alger 2009–13)
  Larbi Hosni (MC Alger 2006–08, USM Alger 2008–09)
  Lahcène Nazef (MC Alger 1992–97, USM Alger 2003–05)
  Amir Sayoud (MC Alger 2012, USM Alger 2016–18)
  Amokrane Oualiken (MC Alger 1962–63, USM Alger 1963–69)
  Hamza Koudri (MC Alger 2006–12, USM Alger 2012–present)
  Toufik Zeghdane (MC Alger 2013–16, USM Alger 2016–17)
  Merouane Abdouni (USM Alger 2002–05 & 2007–11, MC Alger 2005–07)
  Amar Ammour (USM Alger 2002–09, MC Alger 1996–98 & 2010–11)
  Farouk Belkaïd (USM Alger 2005–06, MC Alger 2006–08)
  Abdelkader Besseghir (USM Alger 2004–08, MC Alger 2008–14)
  Antar Boucherit (USM Alger 2006–08, MC Alger 2014 & 2016)
  Karim Ghazi (USM Alger 1995–2004 & 2005–11, MC Alger 2011–14)
  Hocine Metref (USM Alger 2002–08, MC Alger 2012–14)
  Mouaouia Meklouche (USM Alger 2008–13, MC Alger 2013)
  Mohamed Seguer (USM Alger 2012–16, MC Alger 2016–18)
  Hamza Yacef (USM Alger 1997–2001, MC Alger 2008–09)
  Zakaria Haddouche (USM Alger 2019, MC Alger 2018–19)
  Farouk Chafaï (USM Alger 2011–19, MC Alger 2019)
  Mohamed Lamine Zemmamouche (USM Alger 2004–09 & 2011–present, MC Alger 2009–11)
  Samy Frioui (USM Alger 2010–15, MC Alger 2019–present)
  Abdelraouf Benguit (USM Alger 2016–19, MC Alger 2022–present)

Played for one, managed the other
 Djamel Menad (as player USM Alger, as manager MC Alger, USM Alger)

Managed both clubs

Algerian Ligue Professionnelle 1 results

The tables list the place each team took in each of the seasons.

Notes

References

External links
 Algiers Derby دربي الجزائر at Youtube.com

USM Alger
MC Alger
Football rivalries in Algeria